Carbacanthographis is a genus of corticolous (bark-dwelling) lichens in the family Graphidaceae. The genus was circumscribed by German lichenologists Bettina Staiger and Klaus Kalb in 2002. An updated worldwide key to the genus was published in 2022 that added 17 new species.

Species
Carbacanthographis acanthoamicta  – Papua New Guinea
Carbacanthographis acanthoparaphysata  – Papua New Guinea
Carbacanthographis aggregata  – Peninsular Malaysia
Carbacanthographis albolirellata  – Tamil Nadu
Carbacanthographis alloafzelii  – South Solomons
Carbacanthographis amazonica  – French Guiana
Carbacanthographis amicta 
Carbacanthographis aptrootii  – Yunnan, China
Carbacanthographis brasiliensis  – São Paulo, Brazil
Carbacanthographis candidata 
Carbacanthographis chionophora 
Carbacanthographis cleitops 
Carbacanthographis coccospora 
Carbacanthographis crassa 
Carbacanthographis garoana 
Carbacanthographis halei  – Sarawak
Carbacanthographis hertelii 
Carbacanthographis hillii 
Carbacanthographis indica  – Meghalaya
Carbacanthographis induta 
Carbacanthographis inspersa  – Brazil
Carbacanthographis iriomotensis 
Carbacanthographis latispora  – Venezuela
Carbacanthographis marcescens 
Carbacanthographis megalospora  – Espírito Santo
Carbacanthographis multiseptata  – Venezuela
Carbacanthographis muriformis  – Florida, USA
Carbacanthographis nematoides 
Carbacanthographis novoguineensis  – Papua New Guinea
Carbacanthographis pseudorustica  – Sarawak
Carbacanthographis salazinica  – Australia
Carbacanthographis salazinicoides  – Papua New Guinea
Carbacanthographis sipmaniana  – Sabah
Carbacanthographis sorediata  – Tamil Nadu
Carbacanthographis spongiosa  – Sergipe
Carbacanthographis stictica  – Amazonas
Carbacanthographis subalbotecta  – Brazil
Carbacanthographis subchionophora  – Papua New Guinea
Carbacanthographis triphoroides 
Carbacanthographis uniseptata  – Australia
Carbacanthographis violaceospora  – Bolivia

References

 
Lichen genera
Ostropales genera
Taxa described in 2002
Taxa named by Klaus Kalb